Neville Symington  (3 July 1937 - 3 December 2019) was a member of the Middle Group of British Psychoanalysts which argues that the primary motivation of the child is object-seeking rather than drive gratification. He published a number of books on psychoanalytic topics, and was President of the Australian Psychoanalytical Society from 1999 to 2002.

Life and career

Neville Symington was born in Portugal, and was a Catholic priest before becoming a psychoanalyst. He worked in England at the Tavistock Clinic, and the British Institute of Psycho-Analysis, before emigrating to Australia in 1986.

On narcissism

Symington was perhaps best known for his work on narcissism, which he considered to be the central psychopathology underlying all others. Symington introduced the concept of the 'lifegiver' as a kind of transitional object made up from the healthy part of the self combined with aspects of the motherer, and considered that narcissism emerged from the rejection of that object, and with it a sense of an authentically lived existence.

The result of that refusal is that, in Polly Young-Eisendrath's terms, "in place of autonomy, the adult...would come to obey an internal source that the psychoanalyst Neville Symington calls the 'discordant source'".

Religion and psychoanalysis

The origins of his book on narcissism came about, in Symington's words, when "I started to work on the subject of Psychoanalysis and Religion, and it came to me quite early in that research that the connecting link between the two disciples was narcissism". Both subjects were very close to Symington's central concerns. A former priest, Symington in his later writings returned to an exploration of religion alongside that of the mystical elements in psychology.

Symington declared that "[Psychoanalysis] is a natural religion but not a revealed one", its goal of arriving at the depressive position being an inherently moral one. His distinction has been followed up by many analysts who take a positive view of religion in a Winnicottian tradition.

Criticism

Others, however, consider that Symington's search for a positive interrelationship between psychoanalysis and religion leads inevitably to a certain moralism – psychoanalysis being what Adam Phillips called "a moral enterprise...that has to work hard not to become a moralistic one'.

Robert M. Young took specific exception to what he saw as a pontifical element in Symington's study of W. R. Bion, considering that it could be attributed to the religious subtext in Symington's recent writings.

Training, spontaneity and truth

Nina Coltart, in expressing some of her own doubts about psychoanalytic training, noted that "Neville Symington...is of the opinion that a long personal analysis, which we all have as part of our training, leaves the narcissism stronger, and the ego weaker, than they were at the beginning".

Symington had from early on emphasised the importance of the analyst's spontaneity – what he called "the analyst's act of freedom as agent of therapeutic change" – something which may be linked to his existential viewpoint on narcissism.

Symington maintained that "truth in psychoanalysis emerges between the analyst and the patient and...demands that a preconception is abandoned in both".

Cultural offshoots

Jeanette Winterson found the plainness and straightforwardness of Symington's writing style offered something of a framework for her mid-life journey through madness.

Winterson states: "Symington talks about how the mad part will try to wreck the mind. That had been my experience".

Death

Neville Symington died in Sydney, Australia, on 3 December 2019, at the age of 82.

Publications
"The response aroused by the psychopath", International Review of Psycho-Analysis 7 (1980)
"The analyst's act of freedom as agent of therapeutic change" Int Rev of P-A 10 (1983)
The Making of a Psychotherapist (London 1991)
Narcissism: A New Theory (London 1993)
The Analytic Experience (London 1996) – Tavistock Lectures
Emotion and Spirit (London 1998) – Religion and Psycho-Analysis
The Spirit of Sanity (London 2001) – Religion and Psycho-Analysis
The Blind Man Sees (London 2004) – Essays
A Healing Conversation (London 2006)

Co-authored
Joan and Neville Symington, The Clinical Thinking of Wilfrid Bion (1997)
Novel
A Priest's Affair
Poetry
In-gratitude  (Karnac Books, London, 2010)

See also

References

Further reading
 M. & B. Shoshani, 'Freedom: Reflections on Symington's Theory of Narcissism', in M. J. Gehrie ed., Explorations in Self Psychology (2003)

External links
 Official website
 'About Neville Symington'

Living people
British psychoanalysts
British psychotherapists
Narcissism writers
1937 births